Filippo Tani, O.S.B. (3 May 1631 – 1 January 1712) was a Roman Catholic prelate who served as Bishop of Città Ducale (1686–1712).

Biography
Filippo Tani was born in Albano, Italy on 3 May 1631 and ordained a priest in the Order of Saint Benedict on 7 April 1654.
On 1 April 1686, he was appointed during the papacy of Pope Innocent XI as Bishop of Città Ducale. On 15 April 1686, he was consecrated bishop by Alessandro Crescenzi (cardinal), Cardinal-Priest of Santa Prisca, with Francesco Casati, Titular Archbishop of Trapezus, and Marcantonio Barbarigo, Archbishop of Corfù, serving as co-consecrators. He served as Bishop of Città Ducale until his death on 1 January 1712.

Episcopal succession
While bishop, he was the principal co-consecrator of:
Carlo Giuseppe Morozzo, Bishop of Bobbio (1693); 
Giulio Marzi, Auxiliary Bishop of Ostia-Velletri (1693); and
Biagio Gambaro, Bishop of Telese o Cerreto Sannita (1693).

References

External links and additional sources
 (for Chronology of Bishops) 
 (for Chronology of Bishops) 

17th-century Italian Roman Catholic bishops
18th-century Italian Roman Catholic bishops
Bishops appointed by Pope Innocent XI
1631 births
1712 deaths